Zhang Zhongyang (born October 1970) is a Chinese executive and politician, currently serving as general manager of the China Aerospace Science and Technology Corporation.

He is an alternate member of the 20th Central Committee of the Chinese Communist Party. He was a member of the 13th National Committee of the Chinese People's Political Consultative Conference.

Biography 
Zhang was born in Liuyang County (now Liuyang), Hunan, in October 1970. In 1988, he was accepted to the National University of Defense Technology, where he majored in aerodynamics. He joined the Chinese Communist Party (CCP) in December 1999.

After university in 1992, Zhang was assigned to the China National Aerospace Corporation, which was reshuffled as the China Aerospace Science and Industry Corporation in March 2005. In September 2018, he became deputy general manager, rising to general manager in February 2022.

References 

1970 births
Living people
People from Liuyang
National University of Defense Technology alumni
People's Republic of China politicians from Hunan
Chinese Communist Party politicians from Hunan
Alternate members of the 20th Central Committee of the Chinese Communist Party
Members of the 13th Chinese People's Political Consultative Conference